Kyle Robert Brandt (born January 24, 1979) is an American television host, media personality, and actor. He is one of the co-hosts of Good Morning Football on NFL Network. Previously, he served as executive producer of The Jim Rome Show from 2009 until 2016. He is also known for portraying Philip Kiriakis on the NBC soap opera Days of Our Lives, and starring on MTV's reality television series The Real World: Chicago.

Early life and education
Brandt attended Stevenson High School in Lincolnshire, Illinois and graduated in 1997 as the school's all-time leading rusher for football. He attended Princeton University, where he was a three-year starter at running back and kick returner. While serving as president of his fraternity, Beta Theta Pi, Brandt became increasingly interested in acting and entertainment. He participated in local theater and acted in numerous plays on campus, and wrote his senior thesis on the creative process of adapting books into films. He graduated in 2001 with a degree in English.

The Real World
In Spring of 2001, Brandt was selected from more than 50,000 applicants to be a cast member on MTV's The Real World: Chicago, the 11th season of The Real World. During the show, he and his fellow cast mates worked as lifeguards on North Avenue Beach. After the show, Brandt moved to Los Angeles, California to pursue acting.

Days of Our Lives
From 2003 to 2006, Brandt portrayed the character of Philip Kiriakis on the American soap opera, Days of Our Lives. As a U.S. Marine, Kiriakis' storylines included saving his girlfriend from mercenaries, being tortured as a POW, losing his leg at war.

The Jim Rome Show
In 2007, Brandt became a producer and writer on the nationally syndicated radio show, The Jim Rome Show, hosted by Jim Rome. In 2009, he became executive producer of the show, and in 2011, he began regularly hosting as a fill-in host. He has interviewed Peyton Manning, Troy Polamalu, Dana White, Vince Vaughn, Adam Carolla, and Rob Riggle, among others.  Brandt's final day was on July 22, 2016, after which he joined NFL Network's revamped morning show.

CBS Sports Network
From 2013 to 2015, Brandt regularly appeared on Jim Rome's daily television show on CBS Sports Network, Rome. He hosted a segment every Friday called "The Sixer", where he would preview the upcoming weekend in sports, entertainment, and lifestyle. On Halloween of 2014, Brandt guest hosted a special edition of Rome, doing the entire show from the perspective of Han Solo. From 2012 to 2015, Brandt also served as a producer and writer for Jim Rome on Showtime until its cancellation in 2015.

NFL Network
On July 19, 2016, it was announced that Brandt would be one of the hosts of Good Morning Football, a daily morning show on NFL Network beginning August 1.

During his time on Good Morning Football, Brandt became known for his hype videos, particularly in favor of the Buffalo Bills and Cleveland Browns.

Other media
In August 2020, Brandt began hosting the interview podcast 10 Questions With Kyle Brandt for The Ringer Podcast Network exclusively on Spotify. The show is billed as a hybrid trivia and  interview show where athletes and celebrities compete to answer questions related to their lives and careers. The first episode was released on August 12 and featured Aaron Rodgers as the guest.

References

1979 births
Living people
People from Hinsdale, Illinois
Male actors from Illinois
American male soap opera actors
American male television actors
Princeton University alumni
The Real World (TV series) cast members